The HoHun church separated from the Presbyterian Church in Korea (HapDong). In 1961 25 delegates to the Assembly among the Pastor Kim Yun-Chan and Pastor Kim Yun-Chan formed a special association for the safeguard of the conservative Reformed faith. The following year they formed HoHun. Conflict in leadership arose in the early 1960s. A group led by Pastor Lee Do-Bong sought to prolong Park Byung-Hun in the leadership. A new moderator Rev. Song Jae-Muk separated and formed the Presbyterian Church in Korea HwanWon. A clash occurred in the denomination. Later the church had overcome successfully of the financial difficulties. Rev. Sin Eun-Kyun was elected as moderator. A year later Park Byung-Hun and his followers separated, after Park's death most of his former followers returned to HoHun. In 1982 the church established the Committee for Combining Denominations. Several small denominations joined HoHun as a result. In 2004 it had 120,000 members and 910 congregations in 39 Presbyteries and a General Assembly. The Church adheres to the Apostles Creed and Westminster Confession.

References 

Presbyterian denominations in South Korea
Presbyterian denominations in Asia